The Gabela helmetshrike (Prionops gabela) is a species of bird in the Vanga family Vangidae, formerly usually included in the Malaconotidae.

It is endemic to Angola.

Its natural habitats are subtropical or tropical moist lowland forests and subtropical or tropical moist montane forests. It is threatened by habitat loss.

References

External links
BirdLife Species Factsheet.

Gabela helmetshrike
Endemic birds of Angola
Gabela helmetshrike
Gabela helmetshrike
Taxonomy articles created by Polbot